"Emily" is the debut single by American smooth jazz saxophonist Dave Koz, from his self-titled debut album released in 1990. The album proved to be one of the first to spawn hit singles in the genre smooth jazz.

Track listings and appearances 
The song has appeared on several albums apart from Dave Koz, notably in Pure Moods and Greatest Hits.

CD-maxi

References

External links
 Dave Koz's official website

1990 songs
1990 debut singles
Dave Koz songs
Instrumentals
Songs written by Dave Koz
Songs written by Bobby Caldwell
Songs written by Jeff Lorber
Capitol Records singles